Marieke, sometimes written as Marike or Marique, is a Dutch-language feminine given name, a diminutive of Maria. The Polish, Greek and Japanese equivalent is Marika. 

The -ke suffix is characteristic for Flemish, Brabantian and Limburgish dialects, indicating that the name perhaps originated in present-day Belgium or the south of the Netherlands.

People with the given name Marieke include:
 Marieke Blaauw (born 1979), Dutch animator
 Marieke D'Cruz (née Guehrer) (born 1986), Australian swimmer
 Marieke van Doorn (born 1960), Dutch field hockey midfielder
 Marieke van Drogenbroek (born 1964), Dutch international rower
 Marieke van den Ham (born 1983), Dutch water polo player
 Marieke Hardy (born 1976), Australian writer, television producer and television actress
 Marieke Lucas Rijneveld (born 1991), Dutch writer
 Marieke Nijkamp, Dutch writer
 Marieke Stam (born 1964), Dutch speed skater
 Marieke Tienstra (born 1999), Dutch swimmer
 Marieke Veenhoven-Mattheussens (born 1984), Dutch field hockey player 
 Marieke Vervoort (born 1979), Belgian Paralympic athlete
 Marieke van der Wal (born 1979), Dutch handball goalkeeper
 Marieke van Wanroij (born 1979), Dutch professional racing cyclist
 Marieke van der Werf (born 1959), Dutch politician
 Marieke Westerhof (born 1974), Dutch rower
 Marieke Wijsman (born 1975), Dutch speed skater

People with the given name Marike include:
 Marike Bok (1943-2017), Dutch portrait painter
 Marike de Klerk (née Willemse) (1937-2001), former First Lady of South Africa 
 Marike Jager (born 1979), Dutch singer-songwriter
 Marike Groot, Dutch singer
 Marike Paulsson, Director of the University of Miami's School of Law International Arbitration Institute

See also
 "Marieke" (song), by Belgian singer/songwriter Jacques Brel
 Marieke (album), an album by Jacques Brel
 Marijke
 Mariken van Nieumeghen, protagonist in a miracle play from the early 16th century
 Marike Forest Park, a forest park in the Gambia

References 

Feminine given names
Dutch feminine given names